Khwae Noi National Park is a national park in Chat Trakan, Nakhon Thai, Wang Thong and Wat Bot districts in Phitsanulok Province, Thailand, it was formerly known as Kaeng Chet Kwae National Park.

Topography
The park consists of long complex mountains and forests which also includes scenic steep valleys, rugged mountains, rocky terrain and waterfalls. It occupies 123,779 rai ~ .

Forest
The park contains mixed deciduous, dipterocarp, hill evergreen and dry evergreen forests. It is divided into the following forest parks:
Kaeng Chet Khwae Forest Park
Khwae Noi National Reserved Forest in Wat Bot district.
Suan Miang National Reserved Forest in Chat Trakan district.
Khao Krayang National Reserved Forest in Nakhon Thai and Wang Thong districts. 
Since 2002 this park has been managed by Protected Areas Regional Office 11 (Phitsanulok)

Flora and fauna

Plant species include:

Mammel sorts include:

Mammels not further specified:

Birds,the park has some 18 species, of which 12 species of passerine from 10 families, represented by one species:

and some 6 species of non-passerine from 5 families, represented by one species:

Reptile sorts include:
Bengal monitor

Places
 Namtok Kaeng Pu Ten - a 9-tiered waterfall.
 Namtok Kaeng Suea - a 5-tiered waterfall.
 Namtok Pu Daeng Ron - a hot waterfall.
 Namtok Sam Takhian - a tiered waterfall.
 Kaeng Chet Khwae nature trail.
 Khwae Noi Bamrung Dan - a dam with a reservoir.

Location

See also
 List of national parks of Thailand
 List of Protected Areas Regional Offices of Thailand

References

External links
Protected Planet: Kaeng Ched Kwai National Park

National parks of Thailand
Geography of Phitsanulok province
Tourist attractions in Phitsanulok province
Ministry of Natural Resources and Environment (Thailand)